Robert Moses Park may refer to:

Robert Moses Playground a city park in New York City
Robert Moses State Park (Long Island) on Fire Island, on the southern shore of Long Island 
Robert Moses State Park (Thousand Islands) on the Saint Lawrence River in northern New York